Frederick Thellusson, 4th Baron Rendlesham (6 January 1798 – 6 April 1852), was a British Conservative Party politician.

Background
Rendlesham was a younger son of Peter Thellusson, 1st Baron Rendlesham, and Elizabeth Eleanor, daughter of John Cornwall.

Political career
Rendlesham succeeded his elder twin brother in the barony in 1839. As this was an Irish peerage it did not entitle him to an automatic seat in the House of Lords. He was instead elected to the House of Commons as Member of Parliament (MP) for Suffolk East at a by-election in 1843, a seat he held until his death nine years later.

Family
Lord Rendlesham married Elizabeth Charlotte, daughter of Sir George Prescotte, 2nd Baronet, and widow of Sir James Duff, in 1838. They had one son and one daughter. Lady Rendlesham died in December 1840. Lord Rendlesham survived her by twelve years and died in April 1852, aged 54. He was succeeded in the barony by his only son, Frederick.

References

External links 
 

1798 births
1852 deaths
Barons in the Peerage of Ireland
UK MPs 1841–1847
UK MPs 1847–1852
UK MPs who inherited peerages
Conservative Party (UK) MPs for English constituencies
Place of birth missing
British twins